A shepherd moon (also herder moon or watcher moon) is a small natural satellite that clears a gap in planetary-ring material or keeps particles within a ring contained. The name is a result of the fact they limit the "herd" of the ring particles as a shepherd.

Due to their gravitational effect, they pick up particles and deflect them from their original orbits through orbital resonance. This causes gaps in the ring system, such as the particularly striking Cassini Division, as well as other characteristic bands, or strange "twisted" deformation of rings.

Discovery
The existence of shepherd moons was theorized in early 1979. Observations of the rings of Uranus show that they are very thin and well defined, with sharp gaps between rings. To explain this, Goldreich and Tremaine suggested that two small satellites that were undetected at the time might be confining each ring. The first images of shepherd satellites were taken later that year by Voyager 1.

Examples

Jupiter 
Several of Jupiter's small innermost moons, namely Metis and Adrastea, are within Jupiter's ring system and are also within Jupiter's Roche limit. It is possible that these rings are composed of material that is being pulled off these two bodies by Jupiter's tidal forces, possibly facilitated by impacts of ring material on their surfaces.

Saturn 
The complex ring system of Saturn has several such satellites. These include Prometheus (F ring), Daphnis (Keeler Gap), Pan (Encke Gap), Janus, and Epimetheus (both A ring).

Uranus 
Uranus also has shepherd moons on its ε ring, Cordelia and Ophelia. They are interior and exterior shepherds, respectively. Both moons are well within Uranus's synchronous orbit radius, and their orbits are therefore slowly decaying due to tidal deceleration.

Neptune 
Neptune's rings are very unusual in that they first appeared to be composed of incomplete arcs in Earth-based observations, but Voyager 2's images showed them to be complete rings with bright clumps. It is thought that the gravitational influence of the shepherd moon Galatea and possibly other as-yet undiscovered shepherd moons are responsible for this clumpiness.

Minor planets 
Rings around some centaurs have been identified. Chariklo's rings are remarkably well-defined and are suspected to either be very young or kept in place by a shepherd moon similar in mass to the rings. Chiron is also thought to have rings similar in form to those of Chariklo.

See also 
 Kirkwood gap
 Subsatellite (a moon of a moon)

References

Further reading 
 Arnold Hanslmeier: Einführung in Astronomie und Astrophysik. Spektrum, Berlin/Heidelberg 2007, .

Celestial mechanics